Sex tape is a video recording of a sex act, usually referring to a type of amateur pornography

Sex tape or Sex Tape may also refer to:

Film
 Sex Tape (film), 2014 American comedy film
 Sextape (2018 film), 2018 French film
 Sx Tape, 2013 found footage horror film

Music
 The S(ex) Tapes, 2020 EP by Fletcher
 "Sextape", a song by Deftones from their album Diamond Eyes